Mount Carr is a  mountain summit located in British Columbia, Canada.

Description
Mount Carr is set within Garibaldi Provincial Park and is part of the Garibaldi Ranges of the Coast Mountains. Precipitation runoff and glacial meltwater from the west side of the peak drains to Garibaldi Lake, and the eastern slope drains to Cheakamus Lake. Topographic relief is significant as the summit rises 1,440 meters (4,724 feet) above Isosceles Creek in 4 kilometers (2.5 miles).

History

The peak is named after Frank Edward Carr (1886–1915), Vancouver post office clerk and British Columbia Mountaineering Club executive member, who served with the 7th Battalion, Canadian Expeditionary Forces, in Canada, England and France during World War I. He was killed in action April 26, 1915, in France and is commemorated at the Menin Gate Memorial to the Missing in Belgium. The toponym was officially adopted September 2, 1930, by the Geographical Names Board of Canada.

The first ascent of Mt. Carr, which at the time was known as Copper Peak, was made in 1911 by a large BC Mountaineering Club party including Don Munday.

Climate

Based on the Köppen climate classification, Mount Carr is located in the marine west coast climate zone of western North America. Most weather fronts originate in the Pacific Ocean, and travel east toward the Coast Mountains where they are forced upward by the range (Orographic lift), causing them to drop their moisture in the form of rain or snowfall. As a result, the Coast Mountains experience high precipitation, especially during the winter months in the form of snowfall. Winter temperatures can drop below −20 °C with wind chill factors below −30 °C. This climate supports the Sphinx Glacier on the west slope, Gray Glacier on the east, and the Cheakamus Glacier on the north slope.

See also
 
 Geography of British Columbia

Gallery

References

External links
 Mount Carr: Weather forecast

Garibaldi Ranges
Two-thousanders of British Columbia
Sea-to-Sky Corridor
New Westminster Land District
Coast Mountains